Ernesto Alberto Mascheroni Castiglioni (21 November 1907 – 3 July 1984) was a footballer from Uruguay. Born in Montevideo, Ernesto was a defender. He played as a left-back.

He played 13 times for the Uruguay between 1930 and 1939, including in the 1930 FIFA World Cup where Uruguay won the first ever World Cup tournament. In 1934, he moved to Italy to play for Ambrosiana (now Inter Milan) until 1936. During this period, he represented the Italy national football team twice winning the 1933–35 Central European International Cup. He later returned to Uruguay to play for C.A. Peñarol from 1936 to 1940.

By the time of his death in July 1984, at the age of 76, he was the last surviving member of Uruguay's 1930 World Cup winning team; though it would be another 26 years before the death of the last surviving participant of that World Cup.

Honours
Peñarol
 Primera División (AUF): 1936, 1937, 1938

International

Uruguay
 FIFA World Cup: 1930
 South American Championship: Runner-up 1939

Italy
 Central European International Cup: 1933-35

References

1907 births
1930 FIFA World Cup players
1984 deaths
Uruguayan footballers
Italian footballers
Italy international footballers
Association football defenders
Inter Milan players
Serie A players
Expatriate footballers in Italy
Uruguayan Primera División players
Peñarol players
Club Atlético River Plate (Montevideo) players
Uruguay international footballers
FIFA World Cup-winning players
Dual internationalists (football)
Footballers from Montevideo
Uruguayan sportspeople of Italian descent
Uruguayan expatriate sportspeople in Italy
Italy national football team managers
Expatriate football managers in Italy